The 1986 Clemson Tigers football team was an American football team that represented Clemson University in the Atlantic Coast Conference (ACC) during the 1986 NCAA Division I-A football season. In its ninth season under head coach Danny Ford, the team compiled an 8–2–2 record (5–1–1 against conference opponents), won the ACC championship, defeated Stanford in the 1986 Gator Bowl, and outscored opponents by a total of 296 to 187. The team played its home games at Memorial Stadium in Clemson, South Carolina.

Terrence Flagler and Terence Mack were the team captains. The team's statistical leaders included quarterback Rodney Williams with 1,245 passing yards, Terrence Flagler with 1,258 rushing yards and 78 points scored (13 touchdowns), and Ray Williams with 280 receiving yards.

Schedule

Personnel

References

Clemson
Clemson Tigers football seasons
Atlantic Coast Conference football champion seasons
Gator Bowl champion seasons
Clemson Tigers football